Wolfgang Schäuble (born 18 September 1942) is a German lawyer, politician and statesman whose political career has spanned for more than five decades. A member of the Christian Democratic Union (CDU), he is one of the longest-serving politicians in German history. Schäuble served as President of the Bundestag from 2017 to 2021.

Born in Freiburg im Breisgau in 1942, Schäuble studied at both the University of Freiburg and the University of Hamburg and subsequently began a career in law at the district court of Offenburg in 1978. His political career began in 1969 as a member of the Junge Union, the youth division of the CDU and CSU; in 1972, Schäuble was elected to the Bundestag by winning the constituency seat of Offenburg, and he was still a member of the Bundestag in 2022. His ministerial career began in 1984 when he was appointed Minister for Special Affairs by Chancellor Helmut Kohl. In a 1989 reshuffle, Schäuble was appointed Minister of the Interior, and he led negotiations for reunification on behalf of the Federal Republic of Germany. During his tenure as Minister of the Interior, Schäuble was one of the most popular politicians in Germany and was regularly mentioned as a possible future Chancellor, though he faced occasional criticism from civil rights activists for his law and order policies.

After the defeat of the CDU/CSU in the 1998 federal election, Schäuble succeeded his mentor Helmut Kohl as Chairman of the CDU, but resigned after less than two years in the aftermath of the 1999 party financing scandal. In 2005, Schäuble again became Minister of the Interior in the Cabinet of Chancellor Angela Merkel, and in 2009 Minister of Finance, a position he remained in for almost eight years. Described in this capacity as "Germany's second most powerful person" after Merkel, he took a hard line towards Southern European countries during the eurozone crisis and rejected calls from the International Monetary Fund to give Greece more time to rein in deficits. A proponent of austerity policies, Schäuble's 2014 budget allowed Germany to take on no new debt for the first time since 1969, which is generally known as Black Zero in CDU election campaigns.

On 27 September 2017 the CDU/CSU group in the Bundestag announced Schäuble's nomination as President of the Bundestag. He was elected to that position on 24 October 2017. Following the defeat of the CDU/CSU in the 2021 German federal election, Schäuble lost the office by October 2021.

Early life and education 

Schäuble was born in Freiburg im Breisgau, as the son of tax finance advisor and politician Karl Schäuble and Gertrud Göhring. He is the middle brother of three.

After completing his Abitur in 1961, Schäuble studied law and economics at the University of Freiburg and the University of Hamburg, which he completed in 1966 and 1970 by passing the First and Second State Examinations respectively, becoming a fully qualified lawyer.

In 1971, Schäuble obtained his doctorate in law, with a dissertation called "The public accountant's professional legal situation within accountancy firms".

Early career 
Schäuble entered the tax administration of the state of Baden-Württemberg, eventually becoming a senior administration officer in the Freiburg tax office. Subsequently, he became a practising registered lawyer at the district court of Offenburg, from 1978 to 1984.

Political career 
Schäuble's political career began in 1961 with him joining the Junge Union ("Young Union"), the youth division of the CDU. During his studies he served as chairman of the Ring Christlich-Demokratischer Studenten (Association of Christian-Democrat Students, RCDS), in Hamburg and Freiburg. In 1965 Schäuble also became a member of the CDU. From 1969 to 1972, he was district chairman of the Junge Union in South Baden. From 1976 to 1984, he served as chairman of the CDU National Committee for Sport.

Member of Parliament, 1972 to present 
Schäuble has been a member of the Bundestag since 1972. On 21 October 2017, Schäuble became the longest serving member of parliament in German history overtaking August Bebel, who had been a member of the North German Reichstag and the Reichstag from 1867 until 1881 and from 1883 until 1913. From 1981 to 1984 he was parliamentary whip of the CDU/CSU group and in November 1991 he became its chairman. Schäuble gave up this position in 2000 as another consequence of the financing scandal. Between October 2002 and 2005, Schäuble served as the parliamentary group's deputy chairman, under the leadership of Angela Merkel.

Schäuble has always been elected to the Bundestag by means of winning an electorate seat, rather than through a list placing in Germany's system of proportional political representation.

Federal Minister for Special Affairs, 1984–1989 
On 15 November 1984, Schäuble was appointed as Minister for Special Affairs and head of the Chancellery by Chancellor Helmut Kohl. When in 1986 Soviet press belabored Kohl for having, in a magazine interview, made a comparison between the propaganda skills of Mikhail S. Gorbachev and Joseph Goebbels, Schäuble was reported to have counseled the Chancellor against writing Gorbachev an apology for the remark, saying it would be misunderstood as a sign of weakness.

In his capacity as Minister for Special Affairs, Schäuble was put in charge of the preparations for the first official state visit of Erich Honecker, Chairman of the State Council of the German Democratic Republic (GDR), in 1987. By that time, he was widely considered to be one of Kohl's closest advisers.

Federal Minister of the Interior, 1989–1991 

In a cabinet reshuffle Schäuble was made Minister of the Interior on 21 April 1989. In this role he also led the negotiations on behalf of the Federal Republic of Germany for reunification with the GDR in 1990. He and East German State Secretary Günther Krause signed the Unification Treaty on 31 August 1990. In a speech to parliament in 1991, Schäuble clinched the argument in favour of moving the German capital from Bonn to Berlin.

In the 1990s Schäuble was one of the most popular politicians in Germany and there was constant speculation that he would replace Kohl as Chancellor, whose popularity was declining. In November 1991, Schäuble became the Christian Democrats' parliamentary floor leader, replacing 71-year-old Alfred Dregger, in a move that made him Kohl's likely heir-apparent. In 1997 Helmut Kohl stated that Schäuble was his desired candidate to succeed him, but he did not want to hand over power until 2002 when the European monetary union would be completed with the introduction of the euro. However, as the CDU/CSU lost the 1998 election, Schäuble never became Chancellor.

After Eberhard Diepgen was voted out as mayor of Berlin, Schäuble was in talks to be the top candidate for the early election on 21 October 2001, but was rejected by the Berlin branch of the CDU in favour of Frank Steffel.

Some quarters of the CDU and CSU wanted to put Schäuble forward as their candidate for the office of German President, the largely ceremonial head of state, at the beginning of March 2004, due to his extensive political experience. In spite of support from the Premiers of Bavaria (Edmund Stoiber (CSU)) and Hesse (Roland Koch (CDU)), Schäuble did not receive the party's nomination in the end because CDU leader Angela Merkel, other CDU politicians and the liberal FDP party spoke out against him. This was because the election contributions scandal involving Schäuble that first came to light in late 1999 had never been entirely resolved.

CDU Party Chairman, 1998–2000
After the CDU was defeated in the 1998 federal election, Schäuble succeeded Helmut Kohl as chairman of the CDU. Only 15 months later, he resigned from this post as well as from the leadership of the CDU/CSU parliamentary group in 2000 in the wake of the party financing scandal, over the acceptance of cash donation over DM 100,000 contributed by the arms dealer and lobbyist Karlheinz Schreiber back in 1994. Schäuble's resignation initiated a generational change among the Christian Democrats, with Angela Merkel taking over as CDU leader and Friedrich Merz as chairman of the CDU/CSU parliamentary group.

Federal Minister of the Interior, 2005–2009 

Ahead of the 2005 elections, Angela Merkel included Schäuble in her shadow cabinet for the Christian Democrats' campaign to unseat incumbent Gerhard Schröder as chancellor. During the campaign, Schäuble served as Merkel's expert for security and foreign policy.

Following the elections, Schäuble was mentioned as potential candidate for the office of Federal Minister of Defense. In the subsequent negotiations to form a coalition government, however, he led the CDU/CSU delegation in the working group on interior policy; his co-chair from the SPD was Brigitte Zypries. Once the new government was formed, Schäuble once again became Minister of the Interior, this time in the Grand Coalition under Chancellor Angela Merkel.

Between 2007 and 2009, Schäuble was one of 32 members of the Second Commission on the modernization of the federal state, which had been established to reform the division of powers between federal and state authorities in Germany.

Federal Minister of Finance, 2009–2017 

Following the 2009 federal election, Schäuble, by then one of Germany's most seasoned politicians, became Minister of Finance in October 2009. Then aged 67, he was the oldest man in the cabinet and the longest-serving member of the parliament in the history of the Federal Republic. He was also one of seven conservative ministers in Merkel's outgoing government who remained in power. By 2014, the Wall Street Journal called Schäuble "Germany's second most powerful person after Chancellor Angela Merkel".

During his time in office, Schäuble was widely regarded the most vocal advocate in the government of European integration, and a passionate proponent of co-operation with France. Along with Chancellor Angela Merkel, however, he has often taken a hard line toward some Southern European countries during the eurozone crisis. In 2012, Schäuble rejected calls from the chairwoman of the International Monetary Fund, Christine Lagarde, to give Greece more time to make additional spending cuts to rein in deficits. That same year, President Karolos Papoulias of Greece accused Schäuble of insulting his nation. In October 2013, Schäuble was accused by the former Portuguese Prime Minister, José Sócrates, for regularly placing news in the media against Portugal during the eurozone crisis prior to the Portuguese bailout; Sócrates called him a "Sly Minister of Finance".

A leading advocate of austerity during the eurozone crisis, Schäuble in 2014 pushed through a national budget of 299 billion euros that allowed Germany not to take on any new debt for the first time since 1969. In the first half of 2016, he recorded an 18.5 billion euros budget surplus. He has been described variously as the "personification of fiscal discipline" and "Europe's foremost ayatollah of austerity". Schäuble's reputation for tough control of spending has been helped by Germany's rapid recovery from recession but he has repeatedly rebuffed calls from government supporters for vote-winning tax cuts. Throughout his tenure, he stood by his position that structural reforms such as overhauling labor markets in Europe are the way out of a low-growth spiral. In 2013, for example, Schäuble and Vítor Gaspar, his counterpart in Portugal, announced a plan to use the German state development bank KfW to help set up a financial institution to assist Portuguese under age 25 in getting jobs or job training.

In 2012, following the resignation of Jean-Claude Juncker as president of the 17 euro zone finance ministers, known as the Eurogroup, suggestions soon gathered pace that Chancellor Angela Merkel was pressing for Schäuble to take up the position; the job later went to Jeroen Dijsselbloem instead.

In the negotiations to form a coalition government following the 2013 federal elections, he led the CDU/CSU delegation in the financial policy working group; his co-chair from the SPD was the Mayor of Hamburg, Olaf Scholz. Between 2014 and 2015, Schäuble and Scholz again led the negotiations on overhauling the so-called solidarity surcharge on income and corporate tax (Solidaritätszuschlag) and reorganizing financial relations between Germany's federal government and the federal states.

In a letter to the European Commissioner for Economic and Financial Affairs, Taxation and Customs Pierre Moscovici in late 2014, Schäuble and the finance ministers of the eurozone's other big economies – Michel Sapin of France and Pier Carlo Padoan of Italy – urged the European Commission to draw up EU-wide laws to curb corporate tax avoidance and prevent member states from offering lower taxes to attract investors, calling for a comprehensive anti-BEPS (Base Erosion and Profit Shifting) directive for member states to adopt by the end of 2015.

On Schäuble's initiative, Germany became a founding member of the Asian Infrastructure Investment Bank. At a 2015 meeting of the G-20 major economies, he called for better integration of Islamic finance into the international financial system.

When Federal President Joachim Gauck announced in June 2016 that he would not stand for reelection, Schäuble was soon mentioned by German and international media as likely successor; the post eventually went to Frank-Walter Steinmeier instead.

From late 2016, Schäuble served as member of the German government's cabinet committee on Brexit at which ministers discuss organizational and structural issues related to the United Kingdom's departure from the European Union.

President of the Bundestag, 2017–2021
Following the 2017 elections, Schäuble was persuaded to step down as Minister of Finance. He was nominated by the majority CDU/CSU parliamentary group as the next president of the Bundestag, succeeding Norbert Lammert. In his capacity as president, he chairs the parliament's Council of Elders, which – among other duties – determines daily legislative agenda items and assigns committee chairpersons based on party representation.

As Bundestag President, Schäuble worked to curb the antics of the far-right Alternative for Germany, the largest opposition party in the Bundestag.

As the country's second-highest-ranking official, Schäuble represented Germany at the funeral of U.S. Senator John McCain in 2018.

Ahead of the Christian Democrats' leadership election in 2018, Schäuble publicly endorsed Friedrich Merz to succeed Angela Merkel as the party's chair.

Following the 2021 German federal election, the SPD became the largest party in the Bundestag. By convention, the largest party gets to choose the President. The SPD nominated Bärbel Bas, who was elected during the opening session of the 20th Bundestag. Schäuble remains Member of the Bundestag. Since he is the longest-serving Member of the Bundestag, it was his task to oversee the opening session of the new Bundestag, including the election of his successor.

Political views

European integration 
Echoing earlier proposals made by Prime Minister Édouard Balladur of France, Schäuble and fellow lawmaker Karl Lamers in 1994 urged the European Union to adopt a policy they called "variable geometry" under which five countries most committed to integration – Germany, France, Belgium, the Netherlands and Luxemburg – would proceed swiftly toward monetary union, joint foreign and defense policies and other forms of integration. In 2014, both reiterated their ideas in an op-ed for the Financial Times, renewing their call for a core group of European Union countries to move ahead faster with economic and political integration. Countries such as Britain should put forward proposals for returning some competences to national governments, they said, while "the EU should focus mainly on the following areas: a fair and open internal market; trade; currency and financial markets; climate, environment and energy; and foreign and security policy." Also, they proposed the establishment of a European budget commissioner with powers to reject national budgets if they do not correspond to the jointly agreed rules and a "eurozone parliament" comprising the MEPs of eurozone countries to strengthen the democratic legitimacy of decisions affecting the single currency bloc.

On 21 November 2011 Schäuble said the euro would emerge stronger from the current crisis, and ultimately all non-members would be convinced to sign up. He said Great Britain would eventually join the euro (but that he respected Britain's decision to keep the pound). On a British exit from the EU, Schäuble argued in 2014 that Britain's EU membership was particularly important for Germany as both countries share a market-oriented reform approach in many economic and regulatory questions.

In 2015, then-Finance Minister Yanis Varoufakis of Greece called Schäuble "the intellectual force behind the project of European Monetary Union".

In 2015, Schäuble raised the idea of stripping the European Commission of regulatory powers, expressing concern over its neutrality and willingness to fulfil its role as "guardian of the treaties", in particular with regard to the enforcement of rules on budget discipline; unnamed diplomats were cited by Reuters as stating that this was not incompatible with his reputation as "a veteran pro-European who has long favored turning the Commission over time into a European 'government. Following the Brexit in 2016, Schäuble urged Member States to be more pragmatic and take an intergovernmental approach to solving problems.

Foreign policy 
Schäuble is considered a "committed transatlanticist". On 7 June 2011, he was among the guests invited to the state dinner hosted by President Barack Obama in honor of Chancellor Angela Merkel at the White House.

In 2002, shortly before the Iraq War, Schäuble accused German Chancellor Gerhard Schröder of "strengthening Saddam Hussein" by undermining the unanimity of international pressure on Iraq to open up to United Nations weapons inspectors. On Schröder's initiative to join forces with President Jacques Chirac of France and President Vladimir Putin of Russia in opposing the war, Schäuble commented: "This triangular relationship involving Berlin, Paris and Moscow was a dangerous development. It was very dangerous for the small countries in Europe because they perceived it as an axis and you can understand why. We want good relations with Russia but we do not want those relations to be misunderstood." Schäuble, in contrast to many German politicians, subsequently defended the United States' decision to invade Iraq. By 2006, he said he thought the overthrow of Saddam Hussein was in itself correct, but that he was "doubtful" from the outset about the Iraq war because it resulted from a unilateral decision by the US.

Schäuble accused Chancellor Gerhard Schröder of lacking an appropriate historical conscience, because he accepted alleged human rights violations by the Russian government without criticism. On 31 March 2014, Schäuble compared the annexation of the Sudetenland by Nazi Germany in 1938 to the annexation of Crimea by Russia in the 2014 Crimean crisis. Similar to Vladimir Putin, Adolf Hitler had claimed that "ethnic Germans" in peripheral regions of what was then Czechoslovakia required protection.

Domestic policy 
In 1999 Schäuble initiated a CDU/CSU petition campaign against the reform of German nationality law under the slogan "Integration: yes – double citizenship: no". In response to anti-immigrant rallies in the eastern city of Dresden in late 2014, Schäuble said that immigration is good for Germany and politicians must explain better that everyone stands to gain from it; at the time, the number of asylum seekers in Germany, many from Syria, had more than doubled within a year to around 200,000, and net immigration was at its highest level in two decades. "Just as we used millions of refugees and expellees after World War Two to rebuild ... so we need immigration today", Schäuble told Bild when asked about the popularity of anti-immigration policies. Also, he held that "people are right to fear Islamist terrorism. But not Islam." In September 2015, he urged the Member States of the European Union to quickly establish a common European asylum law.

Schäuble was among the high-ranking guests attending the re-opening of Rykestrasse Synagogue, Germany's largest synagogue, in September 2007. In May 2008, he banned two right-wing organizations he described as "reservoirs of organized Holocaust deniers". In 2009, he also banned the Homeland-Faithful German Youth (HDJ), a far-right group, on grounds that it organizes seemingly harmless activities, such as holiday activities, to promote racist and Nazi ideology among children and young people.

Between 2015 and 2016, Schäuble and the Conference on Jewish Material Claims Against Germany, which manages aid to Holocaust survivors, negotiated a budget of some $500 million, the largest one-time increase in homecare funding for survivors the organization has ever secured.

Schäuble had long been considered one of several prominent conservatives who are in favor of shifting the CDU's restrictive stance on gay marriage. In June 2017, however, he voted against Germany's introduction of same-sex marriage.

Domestic security 
Schäuble has been calling for more muscular policies to combat terrorism since he joined the first Merkel government in 2005. Shortly after he assumed the position of Minister of the Interior, the 2006 German train bombing plot became the closest Germany is known to have come to a large-scale terrorist attack since 11 September 2001, and Schäuble publicly stated the country escaped that one only through luck.

As a consequence of the terrorism threats, Schäuble proposed several controversial measures. Ahead of the 2006 FIFA World Cup in Germany, he repeatedly advocated for amending the constitution to allow the military's use for domestic security purposes. Among the methods that he believed Germans should at least debate are preventive detention of people suspected of terrorist activities and assassinations of the leaders of terrorist organizations. In March 2007, Schäuble said in an interview that the application of presumption of innocence should not be relevant for the authorization of counter-terrorist operations.

Later that same year Schäuble proposed the introduction of legislation that would allow the German federal government to carry out targeted killing of terrorists, as well as outlaw the use of the Internet and cell phones for people suspected of being terrorist sympathizers.

On 27 February 2008, he called on all European newspapers to print the Muhammad cartoons with the explanation: "We also think they're pathetic, but the use of press freedom is no reason to resort to violence."

In July 2009, Schäuble said in an interview that Berlin would have to "clarify whether our constitutional state is sufficient for confronting new threats". He said that the legal problems his office had to struggle with "extend all the way to extreme cases such as so-called targeted killing ... Imagine someone knew what cave Osama bin Laden is sitting in. A remote-controlled missile could then be fired in order to kill him." The interviewer said: "Germany's federal government would probably send a public prosecutor there first, to arrest bin Laden." Schäuble responded: "And the Americans would execute him with a missile, and most people would say: 'thank God'."

In the wake of the deadly attacks in Paris on the offices of satirical publication Charlie Hebdo and a kosher supermarket in January 2015, Schäuble and his French counterpart Michel Sapin wrote a letter to the European Commission, calling for continent-wide legislation to better trace financial flows and freeze the assets of terrorists living in the European Union.

Criticism

CDU Corruption Scandal (the 'Black Money Affair') 
Schäuble was forced to resign from the Bundestag in the CDU Donations scandal, known in German as the Schwarzgeldaffäre (the 'Black Money Affair'). Schäuble admitted to accepting DM100,000 (£40,000) in cash from, Karlheinz Schreiber, an arms dealer and convicted criminal.

Law and order politics
Criticism of Schäuble centers on his law and order politics during his second term as Federal Minister of the Interior, especially in the field of counter-terrorism, for which he has been criticised by some civil rights activists. Vocal opponents include the open-source software community. The latest decisions of his ministry have led to a campaign dubbed Stasi 2.0 by its initiators, claiming intentional resemblance to the East German Ministerium für Staatssicherheit.

Controversy was sparked by Schäuble's recommendation in a 2007 interview of a book by Otto Depenheuer, who defended the Guantanamo Bay detention camp as a "legally permissible response in the fight of constitutional civilisation against the barbarity of terrorism".

As a protest against his support for the increasing use of biometric data, the hacker group Chaos Computer Club published one of Schäuble's fingerprints in the March 2008 edition of its magazine Datenschleuder. The magazine also included the print on a film that readers could use to fool fingerprint readers.

In November 2008, a bill giving the Federal Criminal Police Office (BKA) more authority failed when some states abstained from the vote in the Bundesrat, the legislative representative of the states. Subsequently, Schäuble suggested changing Bundesrat's voting procedures to discount abstention votes from the total. Many politicians of the opposition criticized his proposal, and some called for his resignation.

In February 2009, Schäuble's homepage was hacked due to a security flaw in the TYPO3 CMS and its non-secure password gewinner ("winner"). The hack consisted of a defacement that placed a large, easily visible link on his front page to the homepage of the German Working Group on Data Retention.

Relations with Greece
Schäuble came under criticism for his actions during the "Grexit" crisis of 2015: it was suggested by Yanis Varoufakis that Schäuble had intended to force Greece out of the Euro even before the election of the left-wing Syriza government in Greece. This was confirmed by former US Treasury Secretary Tim Geithner in early 2014; calling Schäuble's plan "frightening," Geithner recorded that Schäuble believed a Greek exit from the Eurozone would scare other countries into line. Schäuble also received extensive criticism toward his austerity recommendations from Twitter via the hashtag #ThisIsACoup. Such criticism focused on the fact that Schäuble's insistence on policies of austerity was contradicted both by the empirical evidence that the policies he had insisted on had shrunk the Greek economy by 25%, a degree hitherto paralleled only in wartime, but also by reports from the IMF insisting that only massive debt relief, not further austerity, could be effective.

Tax loopholes
When a parliamentary inquiry was set up in 2017 to look into a banks dividend scandal, Schäuble had to confront public criticism that he waited too long to ban a double ownership loophole that let two parties claim ownership of the same shares and allowed both parties to claim tax rebates, causing the state to lose billions of euros in tax.

Other activities (selection)

Corporate boards
 KfW, Deputy Chairman of the Board of Supervisory Directors (2009–2017)
 Asian Infrastructure Investment Bank (AIIB), Ex-Officio Member of the Board of Governors (2016–2017)

Non-profits
 Friends of the Festspielhaus Baden-Baden, Chairman
 Deutsche Nationalstiftung, Member of the Board of Trustees
 Deutsche Stiftung Denkmalschutz, Member of the Board of Trustees
 Deutsche Stiftung Querschnittlähmung ("German Paraplegia Foundation"), Member of the Board of Trustees
 Deutsches Museum, Member of the Board of Trustees
 Friends of the Berliner Philharmonie, Member of the Board of Trustees
 House of Finance, Goethe University Frankfurt, Member of the Board of Trustees
 International Foundation for Research in Paraplegia, Member of the Board of Trustees
 Max Planck Society, Member of the Board of Trustees
 RAG-Stiftung, ex-officio Member of the Board of Trustees
 Robert Schuman Foundation, Member of the Board of Directors
 2011 FIFA Women's World Cup, Member of the Board of Trustees

Recognition (selection)

Honorary degrees
 1992: Honorary Doctorate of the University of Erlangen-Nuremberg
 2005: Honorary Doctorate of the University of Fribourg
 2006: Honorary Doctorate of the University of Warmia and Mazury in Olsztyn
 2009: Honorary Doctorate of the University of Tübingen
 2011: Honorary Doctorate of the Corvinus University of Budapest

Other honors
 1986: Order of Merit of the Italian Republic
 1988: Grand-Officier de l'Ordre National du Mérite by the President of France
 1989: Grand Commander (Commander with the star) of the Order of Merit of the Federal Republic of Germany 
 1991: Grand Cross of the Order of Merit of the Federal Republic of Germany
 1998: Konrad-Adenauer-Preis
 1998: Ordre national de la Légion d'honneur
 2008: Order of Merit of Baden-Württemberg
 2010: Toleranzpreis der Evangelischen Akademie Tutzing
 2011: Order of the Oak Crown of the Grand Duchy of Luxembourg
 2012: International Charlemagne Prize of Aachen
 2014: Award for Understanding and Tolerance of the Jewish Museum Berlin
 2015: Bambi Award
 2016: Leopold Kunschak Prize
 2017: Kissinger Prize
 2017: Member of the Académie des Sciences Morales et Politiques
 2019: Grand Officer of the Order of the Three Stars
 2022 Grand Cross of the Hungarian Order of Merit

Personal life 
Schäuble has been married to economist, teacher and former Welthungerhilfe chairwoman Ingeborg Hensle since 1969. They have four children: three daughters Christine, Juliane and Anna, and one son Hans-Jörg. His late brother, Thomas Schäuble (1948–2013), was a former Interior Minister of Baden-Württemberg, and an executive chairman of the Baden-Württemberg state brewery Rothaus from 2004 to 2013. His son-in-law is Thomas Strobl, who currently serves as Interior Minister of Baden-Württemberg.

Schäuble and his wife lived in Gengenbach before moving to Offenburg in 2011. They also have an apartment in Berlin's Grunewald district.

When Schäuble celebrated his 70th birthday at the Deutsches Theater in Berlin in September 2012, Chancellor Angela Merkel and Christine Lagarde, the managing director of the International Monetary Fund, delivered the keynote speeches in his honor.

Assassination attempt and resulting health issues 
On 12 October 1990, at the age of 48 and just after reunification, Schäuble was the target of an assassination attempt by Dieter Kaufmann, who fired three shots at him after an election campaign event attended by about 300 people in Oppenau. Kaufmann injured a bodyguard, and severely injured Schäuble's spinal cord and face.

Schäuble was left paralysed from the attack and has used a wheelchair ever since. The would-be assassin was declared mentally ill by the judges, and committed to a clinic because of psychoneurosis. He was released in 2004.

Meanwhile, Schäuble returned to work within three months, even while he was still living in a rehabilitation unit, learning to manoeuvre while paralysed below the waist. For his last rally in the 1990 elections, Chancellor Helmut Kohl travelled to Offenburg, where Schäuble made his first public appearance after the assassination attempt to a crowd of about 9,000.

In May 2010, on his way to Brussels for an emergency meeting of European Union finance ministers, Schäuble found himself in the intensive care unit of a Belgian hospital, battling complications from an earlier operation and an allergic reaction to a new antibiotic. At that point, the German news media speculated about his resignation, and even his chances of survival. However, Chancellor Angela Merkel twice declined Schäuble's offer to step down during a period of ill health in 2010.

Selected works 
Schäuble has written a number of books including 
 Der Vertrag. Wie ich über die deutsche Einheit verhandelte (The treaty: How I conducted the negotiations on German unification, 1991); 
 Und der Zukunft zugewandt (Looking to the future, 1994); Und sie bewegt sich doch (And yet it moves, 1998); Mitten im Leben (In the prime of life, 2000); 
 Scheitert der Westen? Deutschland, Die neue Weltordnung (Is the West failing? Germany and the new world order, 2003) and 
 Zukunft mit Maß. Was wir aus der Krise lernen können (Future of moderation: What we can learn from the crisis, 2009).
 60 Jahre Grundgesetz: Verfassungsanspruch und Wirklichkeit, in: Robertson-von Trotha, Caroline Y. (ed.): 60 Jahre Grundgesetz. Interdisziplinäre Perspektiven (= Kulturwissenschaft interdisziplinär/Interdisciplinary Studies on Culture and Society, Vol. 4), Baden-Baden 2009

References

External links

 Wolfgang Schäuble: "Muslims Should Feel at Home in Germany"
 

|-

|-

|-

|-

|-

|-

|-

|-

1942 births
Living people
Finance ministers of Germany
German Lutherans
Grand Crosses 1st class of the Order of Merit of the Federal Republic of Germany
Recipients of the Order of Merit of Baden-Württemberg
Heads of the German Chancellery
Interior ministers of Germany
Members of the Bundestag for Baden-Württemberg
Politicians from Freiburg im Breisgau
Politicians with paraplegia
Presidents of the Bundestag
Shooting survivors
German politicians with disabilities
Members of the Bundestag 2021–2025
Members of the Bundestag 2017–2021
Members of the Bundestag 2013–2017
Members of the Bundestag 2009–2013
Members of the Bundestag 2005–2009
Members of the Bundestag 2002–2005
Members of the Bundestag 1998–2002
Members of the Bundestag 1994–1998
Members of the Bundestag 1990–1994
Members of the Bundestag 1987–1990
Members of the Bundestag 1983–1987
Members of the Bundestag 1980–1983
Members of the Bundestag 1976–1980
Members of the Bundestag 1972–1976
Members of the Bundestag for the Christian Democratic Union of Germany
Government ministers with disabilities
University of Hamburg alumni
Failed_assassination_attempts_in_Europe